Raimond Kaljulaid (born 27 January 1982) is an Estonian politician and a member of the Estonian Parliament since 2019. Kaljulaid was elected in the list of Centre Party, but quit the party in protest of Centre Party's decision to form a coalition cabinet with the Conservative People's Party, and joined the Social Democratic Party in November 2019.

Career 
Kaljulaid began his political career in 2002 as a public relations advisor of Edgar Savisaar, the then Mayor of Tallinn and father of his partner at the time Maria. He left the position in 2004 and went on to create his own marketing and public relations company which became the main organiser of Centre party's election campaigns for the next 15 years.

In March 2016 Kaljulaid was appointed  to the post of Elder of Põhja-Tallinn district of Tallinn. He was suspected in abetting embezzlement in connection to the corruption probe into Center Party Chairman Edgar Savisaar, but the Prosecutor General dropped the charges due to lack of public interest in the proceedings with Kaljulaid agreeing to pay 1,000 euros into state budget and 800 euros to cover the cost of an expert opinion.

In 2016 Kaljulaid was elected to the board of directors of the Center Party. Strong performance in 2016 local elections was followed by success in the 2019 Estonian parliamentary election landing him in the Riigikogu.

Kaljulaid opposed the party's coalition with the right wing Conservative People's Party and quit the party in protest.

Kaljulaid ran independently in the European Parliament elections in 2019. He gained 20,640 votes but was not elected.

On 7 November 2019, Kaljulaid joined the Estonian Social Democratic Party.

Personal life
In 2008, Kaljulaid married Estonian photographer Olga Makina. They divorced in 2016. In June 2019 Kaljulaid announced his marriage to Jane Palm.

Kaljulaid is the paternal half-brother of the former President of Estonia Kersti Kaljulaid (born 1969). He has said that although knowing each of other's existence, they were not close nor spent time together in their childhoods.

References 

1982 births
21st-century Estonian politicians
Estonian Centre Party politicians
Living people
Members of the Riigikogu, 2019–2023
Members of the Riigikogu, 2023–2027
Politicians from Tallinn
Social Democratic Party (Estonia) politicians
Tallinn University alumni
University of Tartu alumni